The Slander of Women Act 1891 (54 & 55 Vict. c.51) was an Act of the Parliament of the United Kingdom of Great Britain and Ireland (as it then was).

Section 1

Slander imputing unchastity or adultery to a female

This section provides that in an action for slander ("words spoken and published"), brought by a female plaintiff in respect of words that impute unchastity or adultery to her, it is not necessary for her to allege or prove that she has suffered special damage.

The word "unchastity" is not confined to unchastity with a man. To call a woman a "lesbian" is to impute "unchastity" to her.

However, the section then provides that in an action for slander made actionable by that section, a plaintiff may not be awarded more costs than damages unless the judge certifies that "there was reasonable ground for bringing the action".

Republic of Ireland
This section was replaced for the Republic of Ireland by section 16 of the Defamation Act 1961. The proviso was not reproduced.

Section 2
This section provides that the Act may be cited as the Slander of Women Act 1891 and that it does not apply to Scotland.

Repeal
The Act was repealed for the Republic of Ireland on 1 January 1962 and for England and Wales on 1 January 2014 by section 14(1) of the Defamation Act 2013.

Parliamentary debates
http://hansard.millbanksystems.com/commons/1888/jul/02/slander-law-amendment-bill
http://hansard.millbanksystems.com/commons/1890/may/15/slander-law-amendment-bill
http://hansard.millbanksystems.com/commons/1890/may/22/slander-law-amendment-bill-no-278
http://hansard.millbanksystems.com/commons/1890/jun/03/slander-law-amendment-bill-no-278
http://hansard.millbanksystems.com/commons/1890/jun/25/slander-law-amendment-bill-no-278
http://hansard.millbanksystems.com/commons/1890/jul/09/slander-law-amendment-bill-no-278
http://hansard.millbanksystems.com/commons/1890/dec/04/slander-of-women-bill#S3V0349P0_18901204_HOC_283
http://hansard.millbanksystems.com/commons/1891/mar/23/slander-of-women-bill-no-150
http://hansard.millbanksystems.com/commons/1891/apr/06/slander-of-women-bill-no-150
http://hansard.millbanksystems.com/commons/1891/apr/30/slander-of-women-bill-no-150
http://hansard.millbanksystems.com/lords/1891/may/01/slander-of-women-bill
http://hansard.millbanksystems.com/lords/1891/may/11/slander-of-women-bill-no-iii
http://hansard.millbanksystems.com/lords/1891/jun/09/slander-of-women-bill-no-111
http://hansard.millbanksystems.com/lords/1891/jun/29/second-reading-5
http://hansard.millbanksystems.com/lords/1891/jun/30/committee-3
http://hansard.millbanksystems.com/lords/1891/jul/30/slander-of-women-bill-no-233
http://hansard.millbanksystems.com/commons/1891/jul/30/slander-of-women-bill-no-150

References

1891 in law
United Kingdom Acts of Parliament 1891
Acts of the Parliament of the United Kingdom concerning England and Wales
Legal history of England
Repealed Irish legislation
Acts of the Parliament of the United Kingdom concerning Northern Ireland
Women's rights in the United Kingdom
Women's rights legislation
1891 in women's history